Clarence Aaron is an American recipient of a presidential commutation, after having been originally given a triple life sentence for helping to coordinate a drug deal. He was released from prison the third week of April 2014. The mishandling of his petition was among the reasons United States Pardon Attorney Ronald Rodgers was removed from office a short time later.

References

External links
 
 
 

Recipients of American presidential pardons
Living people
Year of birth missing (living people)
American people convicted of drug offenses
People from Mobile, Alabama